Dead Man's Trail is a 1952 American Western film directed by Lewis D. Collins and starring Johnny Mack Brown, James Ellison and Barbara Woodell.

The film's sets were designed by the art director Martin Obzina.

Plot
Texas Ranger Johnny Mack Brown is sent to capture escaped convict Walt Winslow, who had been imprisoned for a $100,000 express robbery. The loot from the robbery was never recovered. When Brown finds him, Winslow has been fatally wounded by his ex-gang members in a stagecoach holdup and is only able to give the ranger a one-word clue to the stolen loot's hiding place before he dies. Brown finally discovers the money is hidden in a painting in a place called Silvertown.

Cast
Johnny Mack Brown as Johnny Mack Brown  
James Ellison as Dan Winslow  
Barbara Woodell as Mrs. Amelia Winslow 
I. Stanford Jolley as Silvertown Sheriff  
Terry Frost as Deputy Kelvin  
Lane Bradford as Brad Duncan  
Gregg Barton as Henchman Yeager  
Richard Avonde as Henchman Stewart  
Stanley Price as Blake 
Dale Van Sickel as Walt Winslow 
Bill Coontz as Stagecoach Driver  
John Hart as Ranger Captain  
Russ Whiteman as Lobo Sheriff

References

External links

1952 Western (genre) films
American Western (genre) films
Films directed by Lewis D. Collins
Monogram Pictures films
Films scored by Raoul Kraushaar
American black-and-white films
Films with screenplays by Joseph F. Poland
1950s English-language films
1950s American films